Vebjørn Rodal (born 16 September 1972) is a retired Norwegian middle distance athlete, who won the gold medal in the 800 m at the 1996 Summer Olympics with the time 1:42.58.

Biography
Rodal, born and raised in Berkåk, made his international senior debut in 1992, at the Barcelona Olympics, reaching the semi-finals in his event, the 800 m. Part of a group of successful Norwegian athletes, he won his first international medal only two years later, placing second at the 1994 European Championships .

By finishing third in the final of the 1995 World Championships, he established himself as one of the top 800 m runners in the world, and was among the medal contenders for the 1996 Summer Olympics, held in Atlanta. Not present at the Olympics was world champion Wilson Kipketer, who had emigrated from Kenya to Denmark, but wasn't allowed to run for his new country by the Kenyans. This made the final wide open. Rodal made the final, which was run in a blistering pace. Rodal overtook most of the field in his second lap, and took the lead at the last bend, crossing the line first in a new Olympic record of 1:42.58, which stood until the 2012 Summer Olympics. With four runners under 1:43, the final was one of the fastest 800 m ever run.

The Olympic title would remain Rodal's only international victory. He failed to make the final of the Sydney Olympics in 2000, finishing seventh in his semi-final. He more or less retired afterwards, although he has entered national competitions on occasion.

Competition record

External links 

1972 births
Living people
Norwegian male middle-distance runners
Olympic athletes of Norway
Olympic gold medalists for Norway
Athletes (track and field) at the 1992 Summer Olympics
Athletes (track and field) at the 1996 Summer Olympics
Athletes (track and field) at the 2000 Summer Olympics
People from Rennebu
World Athletics Championships medalists
European Athletics Championships medalists
Medalists at the 1996 Summer Olympics
Olympic gold medalists in athletics (track and field)
Sportspeople from Trøndelag